Moments of Madness is the tenth studio album by English musician Hugh Cornwell, released on 21 October 2022 by His Records.

Background
The album was self-produced by Cornwell, with all instruments also played by himself.

Coinciding with the album's announcement, the single "Red Rose" was released as across major streaming platforms on 18 April 2022. A 21-date UK tour was also announced to take place during November and December 2022.

The album's lyrical content covers themes of ageing, tattoos and "how the throwaway society is blighting the country with litter".

Track listing

Personnel
Hugh Cornwell – lead and backing vocals, guitar, bass, drums, percussion, mixing, production
Phil Andrews – additional drum programming, percussion, engineering, mixing
John Dominic – harmonica (Track 6)

Charts

References

2022 albums
Hugh Cornwell albums